Saint Kitts and Nevis competed in the 2015 Pan American Games in Toronto, Canada from July 10 to 26, 2015.

On July 8, 2015 the St. Kitts and Nevis Olympic Committee announced a team of 8 athletes competing in 1 sport (athletics).

Track and field athlete Antoine Adams was the flagbearer for the team during the opening ceremony.

After winning two silver medals at the last edition of the games in 2011, the country won a solitary bronze medal through sprinter Antoine Adams in the 100 metres event.

Competitors
The following table lists the Saint Kitts and Nevis delegation per sport and gender.

Medalists
The following competitors from Saint Kitts and Nevis won medals at the games. In the by discipline sections below, medalists' names are bolded.

|style="text-align:left; width:78%; vertical-align:top;"|

|style="text-align:left; width:22%; vertical-align:top;"|

Athletics

Saint Kitts qualified eight athletes.

Men

Women

See also
Saint Kitts and Nevis at the 2016 Summer Olympics

References

Nations at the 2015 Pan American Games
P
2015